This article lists notable people who are natives of Compton, California, or have been residents of the city.

Arts and entertainment 

 Mark Christopher Lawrence – actor, comedian
 Anthony Anderson – actor, comedian
 Daysha Broadway – director, editor
 James Coburn – actor
 Kevin Costner – actor
 Guy Crowder – photographer 
 Ava DuVernay – film director, writer, and producer
 Travon Free – comedian, actor and TV writer
 Siedah Garrett – singer
 Danielle Herrington – model
 Steve Lacy – musician
 Kendrick Lamar – rapper
 Robin Coste Lewis – poet
 Jacob Lusk – top five finalist on 2011 American Idol
 Lynn Manning – playwright; co-founder of Watts Village Theater Company
 Michel'le – R&B singer-songwriter
 Keb Mo – blues singer, guitarist
 Niecy Nash – actress, comedian, dancer, host of Clean House TV show on Style Network
 Krist Novoselic – bassist of Nirvana
 Paul Rodriguez – comedian
 Mort Sahl – satirist, comedian
 Leslie Sykes – television news anchor
 Jackie Lynn Taylor – actress, TV personality
 TQ – singer
 James Wheaton – actor, writer, and educator
 Lillian Yarbo – actress, dancer and singer

Athletes 

 Jeff Trepagnier – NBA player
 Arron Afflalo – NBA Player
 Larry Allen – Pro Football Hall of Fame player
 Alex Acker – American professional basketball player
 Jeanette Bolden – UCLA track coach
 Earlene Brown – Olympic medalist
 Kenny Brunner – streetball player
 Cedric Ceballos – NBA player
 Tyson Chandler – NBA player
 Josh Childress – NBA player
 Robin Cole – NFL player
 Joey Davis – MMA fighter and folkstyle wrestler
 Baron Davis – NBA player
 DeMar DeRozan – NBA player, Olympic gold medalist
 Jim Derrington – MLB pitcher
 Charles Dumas – Olympic gold medalist
 Henry Ellard – NFL player
 Deon Figures – NFL player
 Mike Garrett – NFL player and Heisman Trophy winner
 Nesby Glasgow – NFL player
 Danny Harris – Olympic medalist
 Floyd Heard – NFL player
 Brandon Jennings – NBA player
 Dennis Johnson – NBA player and coach
 Stafon Johnson – NFL player
 Bobby Jones – NBA Player - Overseas Players - Writer/Director
 Don Klosterman – Los Angeles Rams general manager
 Lionel Larry – World Championship medalist, track and field
 Lisa Leslie - WNBA player
 Tiny Lister – actor, professional wrestler
 James Lofton – Pro Football Hall of Fame player
 Mike McKenzie – NFL player
 Eddie Murray – MLB Hall of Fame player
 Syd O'Brien – Major League Baseball player
 Troy O'Leary – Major League Baseball player
 Violet Palmer – first female professional sports official in the United States, NBA, and WNBA
 Tayshaun Prince – NBA player
 Oracene Price – tennis coach/mother of Venus and Serena Williams
 Mike C. Richardson – NFL player, member of 1985 Super Bowl champion Chicago Bears
 Jerry Robinson – NFL player
 Pete Rozelle – NFL commissioner
 Woody Sauldsberry – NBA player, Harlem Globetrotter
 Richard Sherman – NFL cornerback
 Dennis Smith – NFL player
 Lonnie Smith – Major League Baseball player
 Reggie Smith – Major League Baseball player
 Rico Smith Jr. – NFL player
 Duke Snider – Major League Baseball outfielder
 Dennis Thurman – NFL player
 Greg Townsend – NFL player
 Quincy Watts – Olympic track & field gold medalist
 Bryant Westbrook – NFL player
 Frank K. Wheaton – sports agent, personal manager and former official spokesperson of Compton
 Leon Allen White – NFL player and professional wrestler
 Roy White – Major League Baseball player
 Marcellus Wiley – NFL player, ESPN football analyst and radio personality
 Ulis Williams – Olympic gold medal in track and field and former Compton College president/superintendent
 Richard Williams – tennis coach
 Serena Williams – tennis player
 Venus Williams – tennis player
 Don Wilson – Major League Baseball player
 Datone Jones – NFL Player

Entrepreneurs
 John Hope Bryant – founder, chairman and CEO of Operation HOPE, Inc. and The Promise Homes Company
 Suge Knight – founder and former CEO of Death Row Records

Civic leaders 

 Isadore Hall III – former state senator, state Assemblymember, City Council member and School Board member
 Aja Brown – current mayor of Compton and youngest mayor in history of Compton
 Omar Bradley – former mayor of Compton
 Former President George H. W. Bush, former First Lady Barbara Bush and former President George W. Bush lived in Compton in 1949. George and Barbara's second child Robin was born there
 Lionel Cade – former mayor of Compton
 Del M. Clawson – US Congressman and former mayor of Compton
 Doris A. Davis – first African-American female mayor of a metropolitan city, Compton
 Douglas Dollarhide – California's first African-American mayor of a metropolitan city, Compton
 Roger Hedgecock – 30th mayor of San Diego, radio talk show host
 Rizza Islam (born 1990), member of the Nation of Islam and social media influencer
 Eric J. Perrodin – mayor of Compton
 Walter R. Tucker, Jr. – former mayor of Compton
 Walter R. Tucker III – former U.S. Congressman, mayor of Compton; son of Walter R. Tucker Jr.

Rappers 

 2nd II None – rap group
 Arabian Prince – producer and original member of N.W.A
 Boom Bam – Compton's Most Wanted
 Compton's Most Wanted – rap group
 Coolio – rapper and actor
 CPO/Boss Hogg – rapper
 DJ Mike T – Compton's Most Wanted
 DJ Mustard – producer
 DJ Quik – rapper and producer
 DJ Slip – Compton's Most Wanted
 DJ Yella – World Class Wreckin' Cru, N.W.A
 Dr. Dre – rapper, songwriter, record producer, entrepreneur, founder of Aftermath Entertainment and member of N.W.A
 Dresta – rapper
 Eazy-E – rapper, executive producer, founder of Ruthless Records, member of N.W.A, often referred to as the "King of Compton"
 Greydon Square – rapper
 Guerilla Black – rapper
 Hi-C – rapper
 Kendrick Lamar – rapper, songwriter and producer
 King Tee – rapper
 Lil Eazy-E – rapper, son of rapper Eazy-E
 MC Eiht – rapper, member of Compton's Most Wanted
 MC Ren – rapper, member of N.W.A
 Menajahtwa – rap group
 N.W.A – rap group
 Nationwide Rip Ridaz – rap group consisting of Compton Crip gang members
 Problem – rapper
 RJ – rapper
 Roddy Ricch – rapper
 Tha Chill – rapper, member of Compton's Most Wanted
 The Game – rapper, actor
 Tweedy Bird Loc – rapper
 Tyga - rapper
 YG – rapper
 Hitta J3 – rapper

 Westside Boogie – rapper

Other 
 Kimberly Anyadike – youngest African-American woman to pilot a plane solo across the United States
 Roger Hedgecock – Conservative radio talk show host and former Mayor of San Diego

References 

Compton
Compton, California